Evy (Eva) Maria Heikinheimo (4 August 1879 – 22 February 1955; surname until 1906 Heikel) was a Finnish secondary school teacher, school director and politician, born in Rovaniemi. She was a member of the Parliament of Finland from 1925 to 1927, representing the National Progressive Party.

References

1879 births
1955 deaths
People from Rovaniemi
People from Oulu Province (Grand Duchy of Finland)
National Progressive Party (Finland) politicians
Members of the Parliament of Finland (1924–27)
20th-century Finnish women politicians
Women members of the Parliament of Finland
University of Helsinki alumni